Travis Touma is an Australian former rugby league footballer who represented Lebanon at the 2000 Rugby League World Cup.

Background
Touma was born in Australia to a Lebanese father and an Indigenous mother.

Playing career
He played seven test matches for Lebanon between 2000 and 2003 and also competed in the 2004 World Sevens.

Post playing
He now works as a physiotherapist in Sydney, Australia.

References

Living people
Australian rugby league players
Indigenous Australian rugby league players
Lebanon national rugby league team players
Rugby league wingers
Rugby league centres
Australian physiotherapists
Year of birth missing (living people)